Negroamaro (seldom Negro amaro; meaning "black [and] bitter") is a red wine grape variety native to southern Italy. It is grown almost exclusively in Apulia and particularly in Salento, the peninsula which can be visualised as the "heel" of Italy. The grape can produce wines very deep in color. Wines made from Negroamaro tend to be very rustic in character, combining perfume with an earthy bitterness. The grape produces some of the best red wines of Apulia, particularly when blended with the highly scented Malvasia Nera, as in the case of Salice Salentino.

History and Etymology
While negro is from an Italian and Latin word meaning "black", there is some dispute as to whether amaro is from the Italian word for "bitter" or whether it derives from the ancient Greek mavro also meaning "black". If the latter theory is correct, mavro may share a root with merum, a wine brought to Apulia by Illyrian colonists before the Greeks arrived in the 7th century BC. Horace and other Roman writers mention mera tarantina from Taranto, and Pliny the Elder describes Manduria as viticulosa (full of vineyards). But after the fall of the Roman Empire winemaking declined until it was only kept alive in the monasteries - Benedictine on Murgia and Greek Orthodox in Salento. Negroamaro could be the grape used in merum, or it could have been brought by traders from the home of wine-making in Asia Minor at any point in the last 8,000 years.

Negroamaro precoce has recently been identified as a distinct clone.

RAPD analysis suggests that the cultivar is loosely related to Verdicchio (Verdeca) and Sangiovese.

Distribution and wines
The grapes are used exclusively for wine-making. Although 100% varietal wines are produced, Negroamaro is more commonly used as the dominant component of a blend including such varieties as Malvasia Nera, Sangiovese or Montepulciano. These wines are red, or sometimes rosato, and are usually still; though both red and rosato versions may be frizzante.

List of permitted DOC wines
Source
85%–100% Negroamaro:
 in the province of Lecce
 Leverano Negroamaro Rosato
 Leverano Negroamaro Rosso
 in the province of Taranto
 Lizzano Negroamaro Rosato
 Lizzano Negroamaro Rosso
 Lizzano Negroamaro Rosso Superiore

85%–100% Negroamaro:
 in the province of Lecce
 Alezio Riserva
 Alezio Rosato
 Alezio Rosso
 Nardo' Rosato
 Nardo' Rosso
 Nardo' Rosso Riserva
 in the provinces of Brindisi and Lecce
 Salice Salentino
 Salice Salentino Rosato
 Salice Salentino Rosso
 Salice Salentino Rosso Riserva

70%–100% Negroamaro:
 in the province of Brindisi
 Brindisi Rosato
 Brindisi Rosso
 Brindisi Rosso Riserva
 in the province of Lecce
 Copertino Rosato
 Copertino Rosso
 Copertino Rosso Riserva
 Matino Rosato
 Matino Rosso
 in the provinces of Brindisi and Lecce
 Squinzano Rosato
 Squinzano Rosso
 Squinzano Rosso Riserva

65%–100% Negroamaro:
 in the province of Lecce
 Galatina Rosso

60%–80% Negroamaro:
 in the province of Taranto
 Lizzano
 Lizzano Rosato
 Lizzano Rosato Frizzante
 Lizzano Rosato Giovane
 Lizzano Rosato Spumante
 Lizzano Rosso
 Lizzano Rosso Frizzante
 Lizzano Rosso Giovane

50%–100% Negroamaro:
 in the province of Lecce
 Leverano Novello
 Leverano Rosato
 Leverano Rosso
 Leverano Rosso Riserva

15%–30% Negroamaro:
 in the province of Foggia
 Rosso di Cerignola
 Rosso di Cerignola Riserva

List of permitted IGT wines
Source
85%–100% Negroamaro:
 Puglia Negroamaro
 Puglia Negroamaro frizzante
 Puglia Negroamaro novello
 Valle d’Itria Negroamaro
 Valle d’Itria Negroamaro frizzante
 Valle d’Itria Negroamaro novello
 Salento Negroamaro
 Salento Negroamaro frizzante
 Salento Negroamaro novello
 Daunia Negroamaro
 Daunia Negroamaro frizzante

70%–100% Negroamaro:
 Salento Rosato Negroamaro
 Salento Rosato Negroamaro frizzante

70%–80% Negroamaro:
 Tarantino Negroamaro
 Tarantino Negroamaro frizzante

Vine and viticulture
The vine is vigorous and high-yielding with a preference for calcareous and limey soils but adapting readily to others. It is well suited to Puglia’s hot summers and exhibits good drought resistance. The  grapes, carried in bunches of around 300–350 g, are oval in form, medium-large in size with thick skins, and black-violet in colour. They ripen mid-season (late September–early October). The first American producer of Negroamaro is Chiarito Vineyards in Ukiah, California (Mendocino County).

Synonyms
Abbruzzese, Abruzzese, Albese, Amaro Nero, Amaronero, Arbese, Arbise, Jonico, Lacrima, Lacrimo, Mangia Verde, Mangiaverde, Mangiaverme, Morese, Negra Della Lorena, Negramaro, Nero Amaro, Nero Leccese, Nicra Amaro, Niuri Maru, Niuru Maru, San Lorenzo, San Marzuno, Uva cane.

See also
 Primitivo, a similar grape from the region better known in USA as Zinfandel.

References

Further reading

External links
 VIVC Bibliography

Red wine grape varieties
Wine grapes of Italy
Wine grapes of Apulia